Pediasia huebneri is a species of moth in the family Crambidae. It is found in southern Russia.

References

Moths described in 1954
Crambini
Moths of Europe